Aglossophanes is a genus of moths in the family Geometridae.

Species
 Aglossophanes adoxima Turner, 1942
 Aglossophanes pachygramma (Lower, 1893)

References
 Aglossophanes at Markku Savela's Lepidoptera and some other life forms

Oenochrominae
Geometridae genera